The following is a list of the most populous cities, municipalities and towns of Kenya. In Kenya there are only four incorporated cities including the capital and largest city, Nairobi, the second largest and the coastal city of Mombasa, the third largest and inland port city of Kisumu and the newly elevated City of Nakuru that was upgraded from a Municipality to a city by President Uhuru Kenyatta on December 1, 2021. Two of the four cities, Nairobi and Mombasa are cities whose county borders run the same as their city limits, so in a way they could be thought of as City-Counties.  Apart from these four cities, there are numerous municipalities and towns with significant urban populations.

Top 100 list 
The list:

The towns of Ruiru, Kikuyu, and Thika which feature on the top 10 list of the most populated towns in Kenya also fall within the Nairobi Metropolitan region. Data for the largest urban centers in Kenya was provided under the Kenya Population Census of 2019.

Distribution

References

Cities and towns by population
Kenya